John Millar Barr (9 September 1917 – 27 March 1997) was a Scottish footballer, who played as a centre back. Barr, born in Bridge of Weir, Renfrewshire, began his career in the late 1930s with Third Lanark. Spending two years at Cathkin Park, Barr's career was – like many players – interrupted by the onset of the Second World War, and he missed several years, primarily due to being held prisoner in Germany for four years.
Returning in the 1946–47 season with Queens Park Rangers, Barr featured twice, playing a game apiece the following season for both Dunfermline Athletic and Dundee United. Although the progression of his playing career after leaving Tannadice is unknown, Barr returned to Loftus Road as a scout for QPR, moving onto a similar position with Don Revie's Leeds United in 1961. During his time at Elland Road, Barr was responsible for finding a number of Scottish players, with many becoming full internationals. Barr maintained his association with Leeds until his death in 1997.

References

External links
 

1917 births
1997 deaths
Footballers from Renfrewshire
Scottish footballers
Scottish Football League players
English Football League players
Third Lanark A.C. players
Queens Park Rangers F.C. players
Dunfermline Athletic F.C. players
Dundee United F.C. players
Association football defenders
Queens Park Rangers F.C. non-playing staff
Leeds United F.C. non-playing staff